Percy Langdon "Bullet" Wendell (July 16, 1889 – March 13, 1932) was an American football player and coach of football and basketball. He played college football at Harvard University, where he was a three-time All-American from 1910 to 1920. Wendell served as the head football coach at Boston University in 1920, at Williams College from 1921 to 1924, and at Lehigh University from 1925 to 1927, compiling a career college football coaching record of 30–33–4. He was also the head basketball coach at Boston University for one season, in 1919–20, tallying a mark of 0–6.  Wendell was elected to the College Football Hall of Fame as a player in 1972.

Biography
Wendell was born on July 16, 1889, in Roxbury, Massachusetts to Frank Thaxter Wendell and Helen Stamford. He attended the Roxbury Latin School and attended Harvard University from 1909 to 1913. He went on to attend two years of medical school.

Wendell was issued a patent for a design of football nose armor (also referred to as a nose mask or nose guard), a piece of protective equipment used in the early days of football before helmets with face masks.

Wendell was the 16th head football coach at Lehigh University in Bethlehem, Pennsylvania and he held that position for three seasons, from 1925 until 1927. His record at Lehigh was 5–20–2.

Wendell died of pneumonia, on March 13, 1932, in Boston, Massachusetts.

Head coaching record

Football

References

External links
 

1889 births
1932 deaths
American football halfbacks
Basketball coaches from Massachusetts
Boston University Terriers football coaches
Boston University Terriers men's basketball coaches
Harvard Crimson football players
Harvard Crimson men's ice hockey
Lehigh Mountain Hawks football coaches
Williams Ephs football coaches
Roxbury Latin School alumni
All-American college football players
College Football Hall of Fame inductees
Sportspeople from Boston
Players of American football from Boston
Deaths from pneumonia in Massachusetts